Albert Reuben Edward Thomas (26 October 1908 − 24 September 1983) was an English Australian Roman Catholic bishop. Ordained to the priesthood on 30 November 1931, Thomas was named bishop of the Roman Catholic Diocese of Bathurst, Australia on 29 September 1963 and retired on 12 April 1983.

He headed Catholic Action in Sydney in the 1940s and Catholic social welfare in the 1950s. As Bishop of Bathurst in the 1960s, he vigorously pursued an anti-Communist line with support for the Democratic Labor Party. As Australian Director of the Pontifical Mission Society, he criticised donors who wished to give to particular projects, writing, "Today people are so self-centred that even in their charity they wish to have some self-satisfaction. Hence they prefer to give to a specific need or project than to give to a world-wide fund such as the Holy Father's Propagation of the Faith."

References 

1908 births
1983 deaths
People from Farnborough, Hampshire
Roman Catholic bishops of Bathurst
English Roman Catholic priests
20th-century Roman Catholic bishops in Australia